Akçakoca Castle, also known as the Genoese Castle, is a castle built on a cliff located between two bays, 2.5 kilometers west of Akçakoca, Düzce, Turkey. To the south of the castle, in the east and west directions, a high tower rises in the middle of the walls and a water cistern exists in the inner courtyard. The bricks and mortar used in the castle show similarities with the bricks and mortar used in other Genoese castles. 

The Genoese Castle and its surroundings have survived from the Hellenistic, Roman and Eastern Roman periods. It has been registered as an archaeological and natural site with the decision of the Ankara Cultural and Natural Heritage Preservation Board, and is listed in the UNESCO World Heritage Tentative List with the theme "Castles and Walled Settlements on the Genoese Trade Route from the Mediterranean to the Black Sea".

Akçakoca Castle is surrounded by two separate Blue Flag beaches to the east and west. One of the beaches, called Yalıyarlar, is known as seal reefs because it contains caves along the coast and attracts attention. The Castle is the most preferred picnic and recreation area of ​​Akçakoca.

References 

Castles in Turkey
Forts in Turkey
Ottoman fortifications
Akçakoca District
Genoese colonies